Erling Ree-Pedersen (6 April 1922 – 5 August 2016) was a Norwegian civil servant.

He was born in Stavanger, but moved to Moss during the Second World War. He became involved in the illegal newspaper Norges Demring and joined Milorg. In 1999 he co-edited the book Motstandskamp og dagligliv i Mossedistriktet under krigen, a local World War II history.

After 1945, Ree-Pedersen worked as subeditor in Moss Avis and in private enterprise, among other things. From 1976 to 1982 he served as director of the Norwegian Tax Administration (Tax Director). He was also a board member of the Norwegian Data Protection Authority.

References

1922 births
2016 deaths
People from Stavanger
People from Moss, Norway
Norwegian resistance members
Norwegian civil servants
Directors of government agencies of Norway